Vanishing  is a 2021 crime-mystery film directed by Denis Dercourt, starring Yoo Yeon-seok and Olga Kurylenko. It was released theatrically on March 30, 2022.

Synopsis 
One day, a severely damaged and unknown corpse is discovered. Jin-ho (Yoo Yeon-seok), the detective in charge of the case seeks advice from an international forensic scientist, Alice (Olga Kurylenko) to determine the identity of the corpse. Alice restores the missing traces through cutting-edge technology, and Jin-ho uses clues to intuit that it is not just a murder case, but has a close relationship with an organ trafficking organization. Two people working together to uncover the truth of the case, face the identity of an international criminal organization, and the truth of a shocking and gruesome incident is revealed. Everything disappears for a reason!

Cast 
 Yoo Yeon-seok as Park Jin-ho
 Olga Kurylenko as Alice
 Choi Moo-sung as 'the delivery man'
 Ye Ji-won as Im-sook, interpreter of Alice
 Lee Seung-joon as Dr. Lee
 Park So-yi as Yoon-ah, Jin-ho's niece
 Sung Ji-ru as Detective Jae-yeong
 Anupam Tripathi as a foreign broker. 
 Michael Lee as a father who manages a large organized crime to save his son.

Production 
Early working title of the movie was Silent Morning (French: Matin Calme).

Initially, the filming was scheduled  to start in Korea in April 2020 but the filming schedule was postponed after Olga Kurylenko was diagnosed with COVID-19 in March. Finally, filming began in September 2020. It was filmed in Myeong-dong and Namdaemun in South Korea.

Online press conference was held on March 8, 2022.

Release 
Vanishing premiered at 26th Busan International Film Festival in October 2021. It was released in theaters on March 30, 2022.

References

External links
 
 
 
 

2021 films
2020s Korean-language films
South Korean mystery films
South Korean crime films
Films based on crime novels
Films based on British novels
South Korean multilingual films
French multilingual films
2020s French films